Love at First Sight may refer to:

 Love at first sight, a personal experience and a literary trope

Film and television

Film
 Love at First Sight (1929 film), an American musical comedy film
 Love at First Sight (1932 film), a German comedy film
 Love at First Sight (1977 Georgian film), a Georgian/Soviet comedy film
 Love at First Sight (1977 Canadian film), a comedy film
 Love at First Sight (1985 film), an Italian comedy film
 Love at First Sight (2000 film) or Sausalito, a Hong Kong film
 Love at First Sight (2011 film), a British short film
 Love at First Sight, a 2017 short film included in the home release of Sing

Television
 "Love at First Sight", a 1980 episode of The Adventures of Tom Sawyer
 "Love at First Sight", a 1993  episode of Red Shoe Diaries
 "Love at First Sight" (The Bellflower Bunnies), a 2004 episode

Music

Albums
 Love at First Sight (Dionne Warwick album), 1977
 Love at First Sight (Sonny Rollins album), 1980

Songs
 "Love at First Sight" (Kylie Minogue song), 2002 (for the 1988 song, see below)
 "Love at First Sight" (Styx song), 1991
 "Love @ 1st Sight", by Mary J. Blige, 2003
 "Je t'aime... moi non plus", written by Serge Gainsbourg, 1967; covered by several performers as "Love at First Sight"
 "Love at First Sight", by Amanda Lear from I Don't Like Disco, 2012
 "Love at First Sight", by the Brobecks from Violent Things, 2009
 "Love at First Sight", by Carmela Marner and Nick Curtis from the film Puss in Boots, 1988
 "Love at First Sight", by Cherie Currie from Beauty's Only Skin Deep, 1978
 "Love at First Sight", by Emerson, Lake & Palmer from Love Beach, 1978
 "Love at First Sight", by Fairport Convention from Myths and Heroes, 2015
 "Love at First Sight", by Kylie Minogue from Kylie, 1988
 "Love at First Sight", by Michael Bublé from Totally Bublé, 2003
 "Love at First Sight", by Prudence Liew from Loving Prince, 1988
 "Love at First Sight", by Roddy Jackson, 1958
 "Love at First Sight", by Spagna, 1991
 "Love at First Sight", by Super Junior-T from Devil, 2015
 "Love at First Sight", by XTC from Black Sea, 1980

Other uses
 Love at First Sight (play), a 1704 play by David Crauford
 Love at First Sight, an 1846 Pre-Raphaelite painting by William Holman Hunt
 Love at First Sight, a 1949–1956 romance comic published by Ace Magazines
 "Love at First Sight", a poem by Wisława Szymborska

See also
 Amor a primera vista (lit. Love at first sight), a 1956 Argentine film
 Entre Nous (film) or Coup de foudre, a 1983 French film
 Le Coup de Foudre, a 2019 Chinese streaming television series
 Love at First Bite, a 1979 horror comedy film
 Love at First Byte (disambiguation)
 "Love at First Light", a 2012 song by Olivia Ong and Natanya Tan